Jean Morin (Latin: Joannes Morinus) (1591 – 28 February 1659) was a French theologian and biblical scholar.

Life
He was born in Blois, to Calvinist parents. He learned Latin and Greek at La Rochelle, and continued his studies in Leiden, subsequently moving to Paris. His conversion to the Catholic Church is ascribed to Cardinal du Perron.

In 1618 he joined the congregation of the Oratory, and in due course took priest's orders. In 1625 he visited England in the train of Henrietta Maria; in 1640 he was at Rome, on the invitation of Pope Urban VIII, who received him with special favor. He was, however, soon recalled to Paris by Richelieu, and the rest of his life was spent in incessant literary labor.

Works

The Histoire de la délivrance de l'Église chrétienne par l'empereur Constantin, et de la grandeur et souveraineté temporelle donnée a l'Église romaine par les rois de France (1630) gave great offence at Rome, and a Declaration (1654), directed against faults in the administration of the Oratory, was strictly suppressed.

Morin is best known for his biblical and critical work. By his editing of the Samaritan Pentateuch and Targum, in the Paris Polyglott, he gave the first impulse in Europe to the study of this dialect, which he acquired without a teacher (framing a grammar for himself) by the study of manuscripts newly brought to Europe. Not unnaturally, he formed a very exaggerated view of the value of the Samaritan tradition of the text (Exercitationes ecclesiasticae in utrumque Samaritanorum Pentateuchum, 1631). A similar tone of extreme depreciation of the Masoretic Hebrew text, colored by polemical bias against Protestantism, affects his major work, the posthumous Exercitationes biblicae de hebraeici graecique textus sinceritate (1660), in which, following in the footsteps of Cappellus, he brought arguments against the then current theory of the absolute integrity of the Hebrew text and the antiquity of the vowel points.

Publications

 Histoire de la délivrance de l'Église par l'empereur Constantin, et de la grandeur et souveraineté temporelle donnée à l'Église romaine par les rois de France, Paris, 1630.
 Commentarius historicus de disciplina in administratione sacramenti Poenitentiae tredecim primis seculis in ecclesia occidentali, et huc usque in orientali observata, in decem libros distinctus, Henri Fricx, Bruxelles, 1685. (1re éd. à Paris en 1651).
 Antiquitates Ecclesiae Orientalis, Clarissimorum Virorum... Dissertationibus Epistolicis enucleatae; Nunc ex Ipsis Autographis Editae., Geo. Wells, Londres 1682. Publié par Richard Simon.
 Commentarius de sacris Ecclesiae ordinationibus secundum antiquos et recentiores Latinos, Graecos, Syros et Babylonios in tres partes distinctus, 1reéd. en 1655, 2e éd. à Amsterdam en 1695.
 Exercitationes ecclesiastiae in utrumque Samaritorium Pentateuchum (Parigi, 1631), in cui egli sosteneva che il testo samaritano e la Septuaginta dovevano essere preferiti al testo ebraico, una posizione che ha di nuovo nei seguenti lavori: "Exercitationes biblicae de Hebraei Graecique textus sinceritate . . ." (Parigi, 1663,1669, 1686);
 "Commentarius historicus de disciplina in administratione sacramenti Poenitentiae XIII primus saeculis" (Paris, 1651); *"Commentarius sacris Ecclesiae ordinationibus" (Parigi, 1655, Anversa, 1695; Roma, 1751).

See also

References

Sources

External links
Works by Jean Morin at the Museum of New Zealand Te Papa Tongarewa

17th-century French Catholic theologians
Christian Hebraists
1591 births
1659 deaths
Converts to Roman Catholicism from Calvinism